Gedikli may refer to:
 Gedikli, Feke, Adana Province, Turkey
 Gedikli, Gölbaşı, Adıyaman Province, Turkey
 Gedikli, Haymana, Ankara Province, Turkey
 Gedikli, Kozan, Adana Province, Turkey
 Gedikli, Polatlı, Ankara Province, Turkey
 Zarkadia, Kavala, Greece